Isidore Nagler (February 25, 1895 – September 21, 1959) was an Austro-Hungarian labor union leader, active in the United States.

Nagler was born into a Jewish family in Ustia, Ukraine, then part of Austria-Hungary. Nagler emigrated to the United States in 1909, and worked in the clothing industry, joining Local 10 of the International Ladies Garment Workers' Union (ILGWU) in 1911.  He soon rose to become business manager of the local, also serving on the New York Cloak Joint Board, and later becoming a vice president of the ILGWU.  As leader of the New York cloak makers, he secured a 35-hour working week. 

Nagler was vice president of the New York State Federation of Labor and of the Congress of Industrial Organizations.  In the 1938 United States House of Representatives elections, he stood for the American Labor Party in New York's 23rd congressional district, taking second place, with 28.4% of the vote.  In 1958, he served as labor adviser to the United States delegation to the International Labour Organization conference.

Nagler was active in various Jewish organizations, becoming secretary of the Jewish Labor Committee and the Federation for Labor Israel.

References

1895 births
1959 deaths
American Labor Party politicians
Ukrainian Jews
Ukrainian emigrants to the United States
Ukrainian trade unionists